Kocsis-Cake Olivio (born 31 March 1980 in Budapest, Hungary) is a Hungarian politician. He is a member of parliament in the National Assembly of Hungary (Országgyűlés) since May 2018. He left the LMP in February 2013, a founding member of the Dialogue for Hungary, and was elected party leader in 2014. In the Hungarian parliamentary elections of 2018, he was elected member of parliament representing Budapest 5th constituency.

During the 2022 general elections of Hungary he failed to make the list for his party, Dialogue for Hungary, and lost his seat in the parliament.

References 

Living people
Hungarian politicians
1980 births
People from Budapest
21st-century Hungarian politicians
Members of the National Assembly of Hungary (2018–2022)
Dialogue for Hungary politicians